Sky Smith is a fictional character in the British children's science fiction television series The Sarah Jane Adventures, a spin-off of the long-running series Doctor Who, played by Sinead Michael. She appears as a regular in the show's fifth and final series, first appearing in Sky. She is a "Fleshkind" humanoid, bred by her mother Miss Myers as the perfect weapon in their fight against the robotic Metalkind. After her offensive powers are neutralized, Sarah Jane Smith adopts her as her daughter at the end of Sky after she is disowned by Miss Myers. In the unfinished episode The Battle of Bannerman Road, it would have been revealed that Sky is the daughter of the Trickster. The episode was never finished or aired due to the sudden death of Elisabeth Sladen, and it is currently unknown what would have happened following the revelation.

Appearances
Sky Smith first appears in the first story of the fifth and final series, Sky (The Sarah Jane Adventures), when she was left on Sarah Jane's (Elisabeth Sladen) doorstep as an infant. She was eventually revealed to have been created by a race of human-like aliens as part of their war against the 'Metalkind' who inhabited their binary planet system, capable of generating an electromagnetic blast that would completely destroy herself and the Metalkind. Although Sky completed her growth to become a twelve-year-old girl mere hours after her arrival in Sarah's life, thus leaving her 'primed' as the Metalkind were drawn to Earth after one of them was connected to a nuclear power plant, Clyde Langer (Daniel Anthony) and Rani Chandra (Anjli Mohindra) were able to shut down the reactor; the resulting energy surge essentially 'disarming' Sky and freeing her from her status as a bomb, although she retains some electric-based powers. This results in her creator disowning her since she is not a weapon anymore. Back at Sarah Jane's attic, the Shopkeeper (Cyril Nri), who previously appeared in Lost in Time, gives Sky a choice whether to stay or not, and she agrees to stay as Sarah Jane's adopted daughter.

In The Curse of Clyde Langer, Clyde, after receiving a splinter from a totem pole at the museum, suddenly becomes isolated from Sarah Jane, Rani, his mother, and Luke (Tommy Knight). At the sound of his name, the speakers of the name becomes angered with Clyde, rejecting him until he eventually lives out in the streets because of this. The only person who is not controlled by the curse is Sky, who is not human but rather has human-like characteristics. The curse seems to only control humans. Sky notices how everybody who hates Clyde cannot think of a reason why they do. It is only after she visits Clyde's mother that she realizes what is happening. She discovers that his name is cursed because of the splinter that activated the totem pole, which was believed to contain an ancient alien warrior trapped by Native American medicine men, allowing the warrior Hetocumtek to get close to escaping the pole. She then convinces Sarah Jane and Rani to say his name multiple times, breaking the curse over them. Finally getting Clyde back, he declares, "My name is Clyde Langer!" as he touches the totem pole, destroying it.

While investigating the Serf board computer in The Man Who Never Was, Sky accompanies Sarah Jane and Luke to the Serf factory for a practice press launch. While there, along with Luke, she spots Mr. Serf flickering, something everyone else misses and only seen by Sky due to her sensitivity to electrical fluctuations, and Luke because of his acute senses. After telling Sarah Jane, she helps Mr. Smith find video evidence of the glitch when the others are skeptical. She accompanies Sarah Jane again back to the factory, where she rejoins Luke while Sarah Jane has an interview with Mr. Serf. While looking round, she feels electrical fluctuations taking place below her and heads down in the lift, along with an irritated Luke. Once at the bottom level, they discover the technology generating Mr. Serf and the people behind it. They are discovered when Luke notices Sarah Jane in trouble on the screen, however the aliens, slaves called Skullions, warn them to leave. Harrison, the man behind the Skullions slavery and the company itself, captures Sky and Luke and locks them up, separate from Sarah Jane. Sky throughout shows compassion towards the Skullions and revulsion at what was done to them, and tries to persuade one when he delivers food and water to them. She thinks of the idea to use K9's dog whistle to broadcast a Morse code message to Mr. Smith, who passes it on to Clyde and Rani. She helps free the Scullions, but has to operate the Serf hologram along with Luke when Harrison retrieves his pen controlling the Skullions torturing devices. By using the hypnotic Serf hologram, she manages to destroy the pen and deactivate the hologram. Throughout the story, Sky deals with emotions related to meeting Luke in person, and doubts as to her importance, however this is resolved at the end of the episode with Luke fully appreciating her and recognizing her room and role as his sister.

References

External links
 
 

Television characters introduced in 2011
Fictional people from London
The Sarah Jane Adventures characters
Child characters in television
Female characters in television
Fictional genetically engineered characters
Fictional characters with electric or magnetic abilities
Adoptee characters in television